The California insurance commissioner has been an elected executive office position in California since 1991. Prior to that time, the insurance commissioner was appointed by the governor.  The officeholder is in charge of the California Department of Insurance.

The current insurance commissioner is Democrat Ricardo Lara.

Duties 
 Oversees and directs all functions of the Department of Insurance.
 Licenses, regulates, and examines insurance companies.
 Answers public questions and complaints regarding the insurance industry.
 Enforces the laws of the California Insurance Code and adopts regulations to implement the laws.
 The mission is to ensure vibrant markets where insurers keep their promises and the health and economic security of individuals, families, and businesses are protected.

Office 
As a result of the passage of Proposition 103 in 1988, the elected office of the California Insurance Commissioner was created in 1991. Previously, the position was held by a person appointed by the Governor. The Insurance Commissioner oversees the Department of Insurance.

The Insurance Commissioner does not oversee the majority of Health Plans and Health Insurance. HMO Health Plans and PPO Plans offered by Anthem Blue Cross and Blue Shield of California are overseen by the California Department of Managed Health Care.

References

External links 
 

 
1991 establishments in California
Insurance in the United States